Ýmir Vigfússon is an Icelandic hacker and a computer security expert. Currently, Ýmir is an assistant professor at Emory University, where he leads the Emory SysLab (System and Security Lab), and a member of ICE-TCS (Icelandic Center of Excellence in Theoretical Computer Science) and of the ALNET Group (Research Group for Algorithms and Networks).

Biography
In 2008, Ýmir interned at Yahoo! and worked on a novel approach for performing range queries in a scalable fashion on a massive distributed key-value data storage system (PNUTS).

In 2009, Ýmir earned his Ph.D. in Computer Science from Cornell University.

After defending his Ph.D., from 2009 to 2011, Ýmir worked together with Gregory Chockler and Eliezer Dekel at IBM Research in Haifa.

In 2011, Ýmir became an assistant professor at Reykjavík University, where he was the principal investigator and director of the SysLab (System and Security Lab) and the co-founder of the Center of Research in Engineering Software System (CRESS). Furthermore, he taught an elective, intensive Computer Security course in three weeks. The course is closed to only the best 20 students of Reykjavik University (according to their GPA and to an entrance test).

In 2014, Ýmir became an assistant professor at Emory University.

Ýmir gives technical and non-technical talks about computer security and computer science related topics at conferences and other universities around the world.

In 2013, Ýmir co-founded the computer security company Syndis in Reykjavík. The company performs research and development on offensive security technologies, consulting, penetration testing and security software development.

See also 

 Reykjavik University
 Computer Security
 Hacker (computer security)

References

External links
Ýmir Vigfússon personal website
Syndis: Creative in Security
Reykjavík University

Ymir Vigfusson
Computer security academics
Free software programmers
People in information technology
Ymir Vigfusson
Living people
Cornell University alumni
1984 births